Up in the World is a 1956 black and white comedy film directed by John Paddy Carstairs and starring Norman Wisdom, Maureen Swanson and Jerry Desmonde. It was produced by Rank.

Plot
Norman is given a job as a window cleaner at a stately home by the Labour Exchange.

He quickly encounters young Sir Reginald, an obnoxious teenager has an extremely over-protective mother. Due to Reginald's age, the estate is run by the pompous Major Willoughby.

The whole household must kowtow to Reginald. This is epitomised in an estate football match where everyone understands that Reginald must win but Norman doesn't understand this.

Meanwhile Norman develops a romance with the maid, Jeannie.

Reginald demands that Norman take him to London to see a magic show. He tortures him by tickling his feet with a feather and demands that they go that evening... which means he can't take Jeannie to the dance.

Norman is tricked into breaking the TV and a bogus repair van comes to the house. The have come to kidnap Regi but take Maurice by mistake, as REgi has gone off with Norman.

Norman and Regi go to a show and have dinner together. By coincidence it is owned by the kidnappers. When police arrive the kidnappers pin the blame on Norman. Regi gets a bump on the head a and remembers nothing. Norman gets sentenced to 25 years in prison. But, as the one serving the longest sentence he becomes the boss of the group of prisoners. Cleaning prison windows on a long ladder he accidentally escapes.

Heading back to Banderville Hall a series of mishaps ends with him looking like a paratrooper and enters the estate with an army group searching for the escapee. Norman tracks down Jeannie at an ongoing fancy dress party and dresses himself as a harem girl. After a dance with the Major he tries to get Regi to remember him.

Jeannie and Norman fight off guests and army from the gallery. The army starts to use tear gas but Norman bats it back into the party-goers. In the commotion Regi bumps his head and remembers everything.

Norman and Jeannie get married.with The Sergeant and his men as wedding guests in morning dress.

Cast
 Norman Wisdom as Norman  
 Maureen Swanson as Jeannie Andrews  
 Jerry Desmonde as Major Willoughby  
 Michael Caridia as Sir Reginald  
 Colin Gordon as Fletcher Hethrington  
 Ambrosine Phillpotts as Lady Banderville  
 Michael Ward as Maurice  
 Jill Dixon as Sylvia  
 Edwin Styles as Conjuror  
 Hy Hazell as Yvonne  
 William Lucas as Mick Bellman  
 Lionel Jeffries as Wilson  
 Cyril Chamberlain as Harper  
 Michael Brennan as Prison Warder  
 Eddie Leslie as Max
 Bernard Bresslaw as Williams, his cell-mate

Critical reception
The Radio Times wrote, "for his fourth starring vehicle, Norman Wisdom teamed up once more with director John Paddy Carstairs. However, this tacky comedy gave notice that the winning formula was already beginning to wear thin...The worst aspect of this maudlin mishmash is the fact that Wisdom gets to warble so often. No wonder he ends up in prison".
TV Guide called the film a "routine British comedy".

Box office
According to Kinematograph Weekly the film was "in the money" at the British box office in 1957.

References

External links

1956 films
Films directed by John Paddy Carstairs
1956 comedy films
Films shot at Pinewood Studios
British comedy films
1950s English-language films
1950s British films
British black-and-white films